Archbishop Lionginas Virbalas, S.J. (born 6 July 1961) is a Lithuanian prelate of the Catholic Church who served as the Archbishop of the Kaunas from 11 June 2015 until 1 March 2019. He was Bishop of the Roman Catholic Diocese of Panevėžys from 6 June 2013 until 11 June 2015.

Life
Virbalas was born on 6 July 1961 in Biržai, Lithuanian SSR, present day Lithuania), in the Diocese of Panevėžys. After graduating from the local school, he studied at the Vilnius Civil Engineering Institute (1979–1981). He interrupted his studies to fulfill his compulsory service requirement in the Soviet Army from 1981 to 1983. In 1983 he entered the Inter-Diocesan Theological Seminary in Kaunas, which was soon closed by the Soviet authorities. He then studied theology clandestinely and in 1986 entered the Theological Seminary and then the Jesuits in 1989. He was ordained a priest on 30 May 1991, after completed his philosophical and theological studies. He made his solemn profession as a Jesuit on 27 September 2003.

In 1992 Virbalas continued his studies in Italy and earned a licentiate degree at the Pontifical Gregorian University in 1994. He then fulfilled assignments as professor in the Theological Seminary and University, Rector of the Church of St. Francis Xavier, Kaunas (1995–1997), Rector of the Church of St. Casimir, Vilnius (1998–2005, 2008–2010), and Rector of the Pontifical Collegium Russicum in Rome (2010–2013).

On 6 June 2013, Pope Francis appointed him Bishop of the Roman Catholic Diocese of Panevėžys, and on 30 August 2013 he was consecrated a bishop by Cardinal Audrys Bačkis. On 11 June 2015, Pope Francis appointed him Archbishop of Kaunas.  Beginning on 28 October 2014, he was a Vice-President of the Episcopal Conference of Lithuania.

On 1 March 2019 Pope Francis accepted his resignation as Archbishop of Kaunas, which Virbalas had submitted because of health problems. He said he was returning to the exercise of his priestly mission.

References

 

1961 births
Living people
People from Biržai
Jesuit archbishops
20th-century Lithuanian Jesuits
Pontifical Gregorian University alumni
21st-century Roman Catholic archbishops in Lithuania
Archbishops of Kaunas
Bishops appointed by Pope Francis